The 30s decade ran from January 1, AD 30, to December 31, AD 39.

Jesus was crucified early in the decade: his suffering and redemptive death would form central aspects of Christian theology concerning the doctrines of salvation and atonement. Peter the Apostle founded the Church of Antioch. Anti-Jewish riots broke out in Alexandria. A financial crisis hit Rome in AD 33.

In Asia, the Western Satraps and Kushan Empire emerged. In Europe, the 30s saw a Dacian revolt against the Sarmatian tribe of Iazyges, who had enslaved them, and a Samaritan uprising. In west Asia, Artabanus II of Parthia fought a war with Rome over Armenia. The Han Dynasty saw the outbreak of the Rebellion of Gongsun Shu. Roman emperor Tiberius died in AD 37, being succeeded by Caligula.

An earthquake that shook Antioch in AD 37 caused the emperor Caligula to send two senators to report on the condition of the city. In China, an epidemic broke out in K'aui-chi, causing many deaths, and Imperial official Ch'ung-li I (Zhongli Yi) provided medicine that saved many lives.

Valerius Maximus wrote Factorum ac dictorum memorabilium libri IX: It is a collection of approximately a thousand short stories that Valerius wrote during the reign of Tiberius (42 BC – AD 37). Other literary works from the 30s include a popular collection of fables written by Phaedrus, a symbolic interpretation of the Old Testament (Allegory) written by Philo, and a general history of the countries known in Antiquity written by Velleius Paterculus.

Manning (2008) tentatively estimates the world population in AD 30 as 247 million.

Demographics 

Due to lack of reliable demographic data, estimates of the world population in the 1st century vary wildly, with estimates for AD 1 varying from 150 to 300 million. Demographers typically do not attempt to estimate most specific years in antiquity, instead giving approximate numbers for round years such as AD 1 or AD 200. However, attempts at reconstructing the world population in more specific years have been made, with Manning (2008) tentatively estimating the world population in AD 30 as 247 million.

Significant people
 Guangwu, Emperor of China (25-57)
 Pharasmanes I, King of Caucasian Iberia (1-58)
 Feradach Finnfechtnach, Legendary High King of Ireland (14-36)
 Fíatach Finn, Legendary High King of Ireland (36-39)
 Fíachu Finnolach, Legendary High King of Ireland (39-56)
 Suinin, Legendary Emperor of Japan (29 BC–AD 70)
 Heraios, Yuezhi Tribal leader of the Kushans (c.1-30)
 Kujula Kadphises, King (and founder) of the Kushan Empire (30-80)
 Abgar V of Edessa, King of Osroene (4 BC–AD 7, 13–50)
 Artabanus III, King of the Parthian Empire (10-35, 36-40)
 Tiridates III, King of the Parthian Empire (35-36)
 Tiberius, Roman Emperor (AD 14–37)
 Gaius Caesar Germanicus/Caligula, Roman Emperor (AD 37–41)
 Claudius, statesman, Consul, and future Roman Emperor, in office (as Consul) 37
 Jesus Christ, founding figure of Christianity, (ca. 4 BC–ca. AD 33)
 Andrew the Apostle, Apostle and first Bishop of Byzantium (c.38)
 Mark the Evangelist, Apostle and first Coptic Pope of Alexandria (c.43-68)
 Paul the Apostle, Apostle and Theologian (c.5-64)
 Saint Peter, Apostle and first Bishop of Rome (c.30-c.64)
 Thomas the Apostle, Apostle and first Patriarch of the East (c.33-c.72)
 Yuri, King of Silla (24-57)

References